The Ministry of Foreign Affairs of Uganda maintains diplomatic missions with its immediate neighbours, what it calls the 'ring states'.  Further afield Uganda has a presence in Europe, the Middle East, North America and the Pacific-Rim.

Current missions

Africa

Americas

Asia

Europe

Oceania

Multilateral organisations

Gallery

Closed missions

Africa

Americas

Notes

See also 
 Foreign relations of Uganda
 List of diplomatic missions in Uganda
 Visa policy of Uganda

References

External links 
 Ministry of Foreign Affairs of Uganda

 
Uganda
Diplomatic missions